Bârlogu may refer to several villages in Romania:

 Bârlogu, a village in Negrași Commune, Argeș County
 Bârlogu, a village in Stoenești, Vâlcea